Afton is an unincorporated community and census-designated place in Albemarle and Nelson counties in the Commonwealth of Virginia. It is newly listed as a CDP in the 2020 census with a population of 313.

Geography 

Economy 
Afton is home to Hazy Mountain Vineyards & Brewery, Silverback Distillery, Veritas Vineyard and Winery, the Blue Mountain Brewery and Cardinal Point Vineyard & Winery.

Notable residents 
Paul F. Gorman, former Commander in Chief of the United States Southern Command
Rita Mae Brown, novelist, poet, screenwriter, activist
June Curry, benefactor to bicyclists on the Transamerica Trail
Mary Chapin Carpenter, songwriter, musician

See also 
 Rockfish Gap

References 

Unincorporated communities in Albemarle County, Virginia
Unincorporated communities in Nelson County, Virginia
Unincorporated communities in Virginia